Dausara pamirensis is a moth in the family Crambidae. It was described by G.S. Arora and D.K. Mandal in 1974. It is found in India, where it has been recorded from Arunachal Pradesh.

References

Moths described in 1974
Odontiinae